Mala Vrbica may refer to the following places in Serbia:

 Mala Vrbica (Kladovo)
 Mala Vrbica, Kragujevac
 Mala Vrbica (Mladenovac)